Seyed Mohsen Karimi Kiyasari (born 20 September 1994 in Sari) is an Iranian professional footballer who was playing for Nassaji in the Persian Gulf Pro League.

Club career

Esteghlal

Early career
Karimi started his career at the age of 14 in Padideh Sari. He then left the club after a year and trained with a personal trainer for two years before joining Esteghlal in 2012. During the 2012–13 season, he was part of Esteghlal U17 side and managed to finish the season as the top scorer of the Iranian U17 league. Karimi then joined Esteghlal reserve the next season where he finished as the top scorer once more. He also scored two goals against Persepolis reserve in the Under 21 derby on 3 January 2015.

2014–15 season
As a result of Karimi's impressive performances with Esteghlal reserve, he was called up to the senior team by manager Amir Ghalenoei. He made his professional debut in the match against Naft Tehran, coming on as a substitute in the 88th minute for Yaghoub Karimi. On 1 May 2015, he was included in Esteghlal's starting line up against Saba Qom for the first time. He finished his first season with the senior team with only 6 appearances in the league mostly as a substitute.

2015–16 season
After the appointment of Parviz Mazloumi as Esteghlal's new manager, he firmly established Karimi in the starting line up. Karimi played his first game of the season in a 2–1 victory over Siah jamegan.

2017–18 season
After missing the first half of the season due to injury, he returned to action for the Hazfi Cup match against Iranjavan coming on as a 68th-minute substitute for Farshid Esmaeili. On 25 December 2017, he scored a hat-trick for Esteghlal in a 4–0 win against Sanat Naft.

Career statistics

Honours
Esteghlal
Hazfi Cup: 2017–18

References

External links

Living people
1994 births
Iranian footballers
Persian Gulf Pro League players
Esteghlal F.C. players
Gol Gohar players
Nassaji Mazandaran players
People from Sari, Iran
Sportspeople from Sari, Iran
Association football wingers